Cyperus beyrichii is a species of sedge that is native to parts of Brazil in South America.

See also 
 List of Cyperus species

References 

beyrichii
Plants described in 1854
Flora of Brazil
Taxa named by Ernst Gottlieb von Steudel